The Gertrude or Gertrud was the code name of the joint invasion plan for Turkey by Nazi Germany and Kingdom of Bulgaria, the idea began forming in the beginning of the summer of 1942. This code name was eventually changed.

The project was abandoned because of the rapid advance of the Red Army in the Caucasus region, and the Allied invasion of Sicily.

References 

Turkey in World War II
Cancelled military operations involving Germany
Cancelled invasions
Cancelled military operations of World War II
Germany–Turkey relations
Bulgaria–Germany relations
Bulgaria–Turkey relations